Amjad Ali Qureshi (1 November 1895 – 18 March 1972) was a Pakistani cricket umpire and cricketer who played for Northern India. As an umpire, he stood in two Test matches in 1959.

See also
 List of Test cricket umpires

References

External links

1895 births
1972 deaths
People from Bhakkar District
Pakistani Test cricket umpires
Pakistani cricketers
Northern India cricketers
Punjabi people